Leland Senior High School (LHS) is a public high school in Leland, Mississippi, United States.  It educates approximately 336 students in grades nine through twelve.  It is a part of the Leland School District.  Leland Elementary and Leland School Park feed students into Leland High School.

The school in 1982 graduated its first racially integrated school population from K–12, having implemented desegregation in 1970. Leland had a biracial group of parents and school administrators who had encouraged White families to remain in the public school system. By 1992 Leland High School was again majority black. By 1992, many children of White people who had graduated from the integrated Leland school system attended private schools in the Delta. By that time, the black community did not object to the de facto segregation that occurred.

Graduates of Leland High School include former National Football League player Johnie Cooks.

References

Further reading

 William Bert Thompson, A History of the Greenville, Mississippi, Public Schools under the Administration of E.E. Bass, 1884-1932. MA thesis. University, MS: University of Mississippi, 1968.

External links

 
 Official Report Card 2010
 Mississippi Assessment and Accountability Reporting System data
Great Schools profile of Leland HS

Public high schools in Mississippi
Schools in Washington County, Mississippi